Single-board may refer to:

 Single-board computer, a complete computer built on a single circuit board
 Single-board microcontroller, a microcontroller pre-built onto a single printed circuit board